The Cleveland mayoral election of 1969 saw the reelection of Carl Stokes.

General election

References

Mayoral elections in Cleveland
Cleveland mayoral
Cleveland
November 1969 events in the United States
1960s in Cleveland